The Rama language is one of the indigenous languages of the Chibchan family spoken by the Rama people on the island of Rama Cay and south of lake Bluefields on the Caribbean coast of Nicaragua.  Other indigenous languages of this region include Miskito and Sumu .  Rama is one of the northernmost languages of the Chibchan family .

The Rama language is severely endangered. Their language was described as "dying quickly for lack of use" as early as the 1860s . By 1980, the Rama were noted as having "all but lost their original ethnic language", and had become speakers of a form of English creole instead . In 1992, only approximately 36 fluent speakers could be found among an ethnic population of 649 individuals in 1992 . The number of speakers on Rama Cay island was only 4 in 1992. There have been several language revitalization efforts. The fieldwork for the first dictionary of Rama was done during this time by Robin Schneider, a graduate student from the University of Berlin .It is spoken in Honduras and Nicaragua

Phonology 
There are three basic vowel sounds: a, i and u. In addition to these, e and o have been introduced as distinct vowels in some foreign loanwords. Each vowel may be either short or long. Here the vowels are shown in standard Rama orthography
(see for example ):

The following consonants are found (IPA transcriptions are shown where helpful):

Rama words have non-predictable stress.

Phonotactics and sandhi 
Rama phonotactics includes notable consonant clusters at the beginning of words (e.g.  "toucan",  "hot",  "man",  "killed") and word-internally (e.g.  "speaks",  "fish"). Variations among speakers witness a tendency to simplify such clusters (e.g.  or  "man",  or  "we, us, our").

Such clusters often arise due to a tendency to omit unstressed short vowels. For example, when the third person singular subject prefix i- and the past tense suffix -u are added to the verb stem  "eat", thus: i- +  + -u, the verb stem loses its only vowel, resulting in the form  "he/she/it ate". Sometimes omitting different vowels may lead to alternative results. Adding the past tense suffix -u to the verb stem  "kill", i.e.  + -u, may give either  or  "killed".

There are also cases of vowel alternation in morphemes (e.g. the first-person subject prefix may appear as n-, ni- or na-) and lexical stems (thus the stem  "stay" may appear in the forms aakir-i "stays" and aaikur-u "stayed", where the short stem vowel copies the vowel of the suffix).

Consonants display a degree of sandhi-type alternation, as seen for example in the final consonant of the same stem  "stay, be", cf. the imperative  "stay!". This latter variant is found both word-final and before a suffix beginning with a consonant (e.g.  "if there is").

Grammar 
In terms of grammatical typology Rama may be considered a fairly "normal" language for the linguistic area within which it is located, despite the lack of close genetic ties with its immediate neighbours. For example, Rama shares some general typological features with Miskito, a dominant contact language, displaying many characteristics typical of SOV languages (even though not all sentences are actually verb-final). A single set of prefixes serves to express both pronominal possessors (e.g. n- "my eye") and subjects (e.g. n- "I went"). Noun phrase relations are indicated by postpositions, tense and subordination by verbal suffixes.

Noun phrase

Elements of the noun phrase 
There are no articles. Nouns are frequently undetermined, e.g.  "(The) lizard walks on (the) ground" (literally: lizard ground on (s)he-walks),  "He/she caught (a) fish with (a) hook" (fish hook with (s)he-caught).

Demonstrative determiners precede the noun:  "this house",  "that dog". Quantifiers follow the noun:  "one dog",  "two cats",  "many houses",  "every morning",  "all the people",  "the other dog, another dog".

Attributive adjectives follow the noun they qualify:  "(a/the) big fish".

Possession 
Inalienable pronominal possession, found with body parts and characteristics, is expressed by prefixes attached to the possessed noun:  "my eye",  "his/her strength",  "our fingers".

In other cases (including kinship relations), a genitive pronoun (formed from the pronominal prefix + ) precedes the possessed noun, e.g.  "my cat / house / name / child / father / sister",  "your family (lit. your people)",  "his/her name",  "our Rama language".

The forms  etc. also function predicatively (as equivalents of English possessive pronouns), as in  "That cat is mine".

Nominal possession is expressed by two constructions: possessor + possessed (i.e. simple juxtaposition), e.g.  "my father's name" (my father name), and possessor +  + possessed ( being a genitive postposition), e.g.  "Nora's house".

Pronouns 
Personal pronouns have free (independent) and bound (prefix) forms as in the following table. The third person singular bound form is i- before a consonant or y- before a vowel.

The independent pronouns are often used as subjects:  "I live in Bluefields" (I town in stay),  "Can you sew a dress?" (you dress sew-IRREALIS),  "He/She is going". They may also be complements of postpositions:  "My mother lives in this house with me" (my mother this house in stay I with),  "from you",  "The tiger came out at them" (tiger they at came-out). Note that -ut changes to -ul before a vowel, for example in  "with us".

The prefix forms of the pronouns are used as subject prefixes with verbs:  "I gave it to Nelly" (Nelly OBJECT I-gave),  "Tomorrow I will cook some meat" (tomorrow meat I-will-cook),  "With whom did you go?" (who with you-went),  "he/she went",  "They came to the island" (island in they-came). In the second person plural, m- is prefixed and -lut suffixed to the verb.

They are also commonly absent in the presence of a full subject noun phrase:  "My father is going", but "repetition" of the subject is also possible:  "The lizard (he) walks on the ground" (lizard ground on it-walks).

A pronominal object is expressed by adding the postposition aa to the pronouns, which adopt the prefix form in the singular but the full form in the plural:  but  (for ) etc. But third person objects are commonly zero-marked, that is, the absence of an overt object of a transitive verb implies an understood "him", "her" or "it", e.g. Anangsku "They cleaned it" (lit. they-cleaned).

The demonstrative pronouns are the same as the corresponding determiners:  "this",  "that", as in  "This is my house".

The interrogative pronouns are  "what",  "who", as in  "What is your name?",  "Who speaks Rama?" (who Rama language speaks),  "With whom did you go?" (who with you-went).

Postpositions 
Rama postpositions perform roughly the same functions as English prepositions, as in  "on the ground",  "in (the) town",  "with me",  "of the house", etc.

Postpositional phrases may occur either before or after the verb. Some postpositions have a shorter and a longer form; following the verb the long forms are used, e.g.  "I ran away from my father" (I-ran my father from) but before the verb the short forms are more usual:  (my father from I-ran).

"The tiger ate the man" (tiger man ate).

In addition to the simple postpositions there are more complex forms of the relational type that express more specific relationships. These are composed of a noun-like lexical form followed by a postposition, such as  "inside",  "out of". They are placed after a noun phrase, e.g.  "inside the hole", or a postpositional phrase, e.g.  "out of the pot" (literally: pot in out-from). Such expressions may also be used adverbially.

The verb

Overview 
The simplest structure for verb forms consists of these elements:

 an optional subject prefix (already discussed above under Pronouns)
 the verb stem
 either a tense/mood suffix (or zero) or a subordination marker

e.g.  "I live in Bluefields" (no subject prefix and no tense suffix),  "He/She is going" (no subject prefix, present tense suffix),  "With whom did you go?" (second person subject prefix, past tense suffix),  "I will cook some meat" (first person subject prefix, future/irrealis suffix),  "when they see the tiger" (third person plural subject prefix, "when" subordinator),  "I am looking for meat to buy" (first person singular subject prefix, purpose subordinator).

This basic structure may be expanded by adding other elements, including aspect markers (which come between the stem and the tense/mood suffix) and preverbs (which precede the subject prefix, if present). More complex meanings can be expressed through the use of serial verb constructions.

Tense/mood and subordinator suffixes 
Most verb forms end in a suffix such as one of the following which either specifies a tense (or a mood) or else signals a subordinate clause:

Use of one of the subordinator suffixes constitutes the main subordination strategy. Since these suffixes occupy the same place as the tense suffixes, the resulting subordinate clauses are tenseless, in this respect resembling non-finite clauses in European languages. Nonetheless, Rama verb forms with subordinators take subject prefixes under the same basic conditions as tensed ones, and in this way resemble finite forms.

Examples with  "come":  "I am coming",  "I came",  "I will come",  "for me to come",  "when I come",  "if I come" etc.

In some cases the lack of any suffix signals a lack of marked tense or a habitual sense: compare  "I am ready to go" (now) with  "I live in the town". Imperatives in the second person singular are also suffixless, e.g.  "Come!" One verb,  "go", has a suppletive imperative  or  "go!".

Sometimes forms with the -bang suffix are used in independent clauses: see the section on Aspect below.

Aspect 
Using the simple past tense of  "eat", the sentence  means "The tiger ate the man", but the "manner of eating" may be specified further to express completion of the action by adding to the stem  the aspect marker , giving  "The tiger ate the man all up". Another aspect-marking suffix similarly used is  expressing repetition.

A range of further aspectual nuances may be conveyed by a variety of periphrastic constructions. Several of these involve the verb  "stay" or its derivative  (which contains the preverb ), either of which, following a verb stem, may convey progressive aspect:  "I am crying" ( "cry"; the second vowel in  can copy the vowel of the suffix).  can also express "be about to (do something)".

The suffix  (see also above) may express intention, as in  "I am going to look at the baby" ( "look at"), and in first person plural imperatives (i.e. "let's..."), as in  "Let's sleep!" ( "sleep"). In the latter use the subject prefix may be omitted, e.g.  "Let's speak Rama!" ( "speak").

"I am ready to go" ( "go").

One other means of expressing aspectual (or mood) nuances is provided by the use of a second set of emphatic tense suffixes which replace the simple suffixes, namely  emphatic affirmative,  habitual past and  emphatic future.

Modality 
Modal notions are expressed by further periphrastic constructions. A verb with the  suffix may be used in an independent clause to convey obligation:  "All the children must go to school".  is used as a modal auxiliary of volition, as in  "I want to learn Rama" ( "learn"). "Will/can you sew a dress?" Inability is expressed by the negator  preceding the complete verb, e.g. "I cannot speak Rama".

Preverbs 
Rama has preverbs which form constructions comparable to English phrasal verbs such as "run away", "come over", "carry on" etc. Like English phrasal verbs, the meanings and uses of Rama preverb constructions can be quite idiomatic and unpredictable. Preverbs precede the subject prefix if present:  "I ran away from (him/her)" ( "run" with the preverb  "from":  is the subject prefix). "They brought the wild pig to the town" ( "come with, i.e. bring"). "Who took the child?" ( "go with, i.e. take").

While many preverb-verb combinations are lexically specified,  may also be used productively to express an instrumental argument, e.g.  "That's why we have tongs, in order to roast meat with (them)" (therefore tongs we-have, meat for-we-roast-with).

Serial verbs 
A limited range of serial-type constructions are found. A notable case of this is the use of the verb  "walk" following another verb, as in:  "Men of Rama Cay go to look for manatee in the lagoon" (island from man manatee they-seek walk lagoon side). The morphological analysis of  "they go to look for" is:  (PREVERB-they-seek walk-PRESENT).

The sentence

'Be' and 'have' 
Noun and adjective predicates are constructed without a copula, in the order Subject + Predicate, e.g.  "This is my house" (this my house),  "His name is Basilio" (his name Basilio),  "The manatee is a big animal" (manatee animal big),  "My house is pretty" (my house pretty); so also  "That cat is mine" and  "My cat is for killing rats". The Subject + Predicate order is inverted in a question such as  "What is his name?"

The verb  "stay" is used to express "be (in a place)" and "be (in a state)", as in  "The school is on the south side" (school south side in stay),  "I am fine" (I well stay).  can also mean "live (in a place)" as in  "I live on Rama Cay" (I island in stay), and "there is" as in  "There are many houses on Rama Cay" (house many island in stay).

The verb  (or ) means "have", e.g.  "I have two sisters" (I sister two have),  "That's why we have tongs",  "The octopus has many arms".

Word order with verbal predicates 
In sentences with a verb as predicate, the basic order is:
 SV if intransitive, e.g.  "The frog jumps",  "I am crying" (I cry AUXILIARY),  "My child is sick" (my child is-sick)
 SOV if transitive (assuming that both arguments are present as noun phrases in the utterance), e.g.  "The tiger ate the man" (tiger man ate),  "Nora speaks Rama" (Nora Rama language speaks), Nah tausung saiming kuaakar "I have one dog" (I dog one have).
Other sentence elements (in bold here) may be placed:
 in front of the verb:  "The lizard walks on the ground",  "The scorpion bites with its tail",  "They came to the island",  "There are many houses on the island",  "Speak with me!",  "I grew up on the south side",  "I don't want to go for water",  "He caught a big fish with a hook",  "The tiger came out every morning".
 at the end of the sentence (i.e. after the verb):  "We are learning Rama with Nora",  "My mother lives in this house with me",  "The man kills the wari with a lance",  "Can you sew a dress like mine?",  "My father brings the silkgrass into the house",  "when he brings the tongs into the house",  "when the oil comes out of the pot".
 or at the beginning of the sentence:  "I was born on Rama Cay",  "She took the child inside the hole",  "They put the oil in the empty pot",  "Tomorrow I will cook meat".
Clausal elements (i.e. those containing a verb) usually follow the main verb, e.g.  "I am going to plant corn",  "I am looking for meat to buy",  "They are happy when they hear about the manatee".

Questions 
Yes/no questions take the same form as the corresponding statement, e.g.  "Is your house big?",  "Do you live on Rama Cay?",  "Do you speak Rama?",  "Have you a sister?",  "Can you sew a dress like mine?" Such questions may be answered using  "Yes" or  "No".

Some question words (sometimes called wh-words):

Question words may be preceded by another sentence constituent as topic, e.g.  "Who took the child?" (child who took),  "And you, where do you live?" (you, where live).

However, question words generally stand at the beginning of the sentence:  "Where do you live?" (where you live),  "Where does the wari live?" (where wari lives),  "Where is Nora's house?" (where Nora GENITIVE house stay),  "Where is he/she going?" (where he/she goes),  "Where is his/her father going?" (where his/her father goes),  "Who speaks our Rama language?" (who our Rama language speaks),  "With whom did you go?" (who with you-went).

Questions words with a non-verbal predicate:  "What is your name?",  "How is your family?"

Negation 
Sentences may be negated by placing  after the verb or predicate, e.g.  "I do not live on Rama Cay",  "You do not speak Rama",  "My house is not big",  "That dog is not mine", or by placing aa before the verb, e.g.  "They didn't look for the manatee",  "I don't want to go".

There is a special negative word, to express impossibility, e.g.  "I cannot live in Bluefields".

Coordination and subordination 
Coordinating conjunctions:  "and",  "but":  "My sister and my brother live in this house with me",  "I have one dog and you have two cats",  "My house is not big, but it is pretty".

Subordinate clauses may be formed by means of subordinator suffixes as described above. Reported speech is formed by juxtaposition as in  "They found it, they say" ( "find",  "say"). Relative clauses also have no specific subordinator but the clause marker  may be employed, e.g.  "The meat I bought, I gave it to Nelly" (meat I-bought  Nelly OBJECT I-gave).

Lexicon 
Rama has borrowed words from Miskito (e.g.  "big"), English, Rama Cay Creole and Spanish. Besides such loans, Rama has a primary lexicon of Chibchan origin, expanded through various word-formation processes.

"eat" and  "speak", or involve more complex relationships, e.g.

Certain recurrent endings found in numerous noun stems appear to correspond to vague semantic classes. As an inalienable noun in its own right,  means "eye" or "seed".

Composition is another common way of forming nouns, as in  "meat" (from  "animal" +  "flesh") or the inalienable noun  "eyelash" (from  "eye" +  "hair").

New concepts can also be expressed syntactically, e.g. through genitive constructions such as  "church" (lit. house of prayer), or through verbal paraphrase.

Partial or complete reduplication is seen in the forms of some words, including onomatopoeics such as  "dripping", animal names like  "spider" or  "rabbit", colour names and other descriptive adjectives such as  "yellow",  "green",  "speckled",  "calm", and others, e.g.  "a little".

Some recorded words that were claimed to be from the Corobicí language are actually from a dialect of Rama spoken in the region of Upala.

Notes

References 
 .
 .
 .
 .
 .
 .
 .
 .
 .
 .
 .
 .
 .

External links 
 Turkulka – online dictionary and other resources
 Rama Language Project home page
 ELAR archive of Rama language documentation materials

Chibchan languages
Endangered Chibchan languages
Language revival
Languages of Nicaragua
Mesoamerican languages
South Caribbean Coast Autonomous Region